Corinne Cléry (born 23 March 1950), also known as Corinne Piccolo, is a French actress.  She is known for the films Moonraker (1979), The Story of O (1975), Hitch-Hike (1977) and Yor, the Hunter from the Future (1983).

Early life and career

Cléry was born on 23 March 1950 near Paris and raised in Saint-Germain-en-Laye. She began her acting career in the late 1960s under the name Corinne Piccoli. Her first important film was Joël Le Moigne's Les Poneyttes with Johnny Hallyday and DJ Hubert Wayaffe, whom she married at the end of the filming, aged 17.

Cléry first came to prominence in the movie Story of O (1975) (Histoire d'O). She also modelled for the cover of French magazine Lui in which she is holding a huge copy of the novel upon which the film is based.

Cléry is also known for playing Bond girl Corinne Dufour, antagonist Hugo Drax's assistant, in the 1979 James Bond film Moonraker. She also starred with Bond girl Barbara Bach (who played Anya Amasova in The Spy Who Loved Me) and Richard Kiel (who played Bond villain Jaws) in the film The Humanoid (1979). Following Moonraker, she appeared in several Italian language films. She also starred in the films Covert Action, Hitch Hike with actor David Hess, Sergio Corbucci's The Con Artists with Adriano Celentano and Anthony Quinn, and the science fiction film Yor, the Hunter from the Future.

Cléry became a housemate in the second season of Grande Fratello VIP, the Italian adaptation of Celebrity Big Brother.

Filmography

References

External links

 
 Cléry's profile for Moonraker at jamesbondmm.co.uk

1950 births
Living people
Actresses from Paris
French film actresses
20th-century French actresses
21st-century French actresses
French people of Italian descent
French television actresses
People from Saint-Germain-en-Laye